St. Paul's Episcopal Day School is a private primary school in Kansas City, Missouri. Established in 1963, the school serves students in toddler through eighth grade.

History
Dr. Clifford R. Nobes, then the pastor of St. Paul's Episcopal Church, created the school in 1963. The school had a preschool in the church building with 43 students and 4 staff members. In 1970 the school purchased the former Rollins Elementary School building. The school burned down in 1992 after stage lights overheated and caught fire. Classes resumed in the Temple B'nai Jehudah. The school rebuilt a three story brick building on the same midtown location in 1994.

Campus
St. Paul's has been located in the Westport neighborhood since the school's establishment. The school's current building was completed in 1994 on the site of the school's former building, which burned down in 1992. A new wing was completed in January 2009.

Athletics 
St. Paul's is a part of the Metropolitan Private School League. Teams are divided evenly with no regards to skill for 5th and 6th graders. However, in 7th and 8th grade teams are formed based on skill level with the Gold Team as the most advanced.

The following sports are available to boys at St. Paul's Episcopal Day School:

The following sports are available to girls at St.Paul's Episcopal Day School:

Accreditation and memberships 
St. Paul's Episcopal Day School is accredited or a member of the following organizations: 
 Independent Schools Association of the Central States (ISACS)
 National Association of Independent Schools (NAIS)
 National Association of Episcopal Schools (NAES)
 Metropolitan Private School League* (MPSL)
*Sports

Former headmasters
 Larry L. L'Heureux 
 Terry Bartow (1994–2004)

References

External links
St. Paul's Episcopal Day School

Schools in Kansas City, Missouri
Educational institutions established in 1963
Episcopal schools in the United States
Schools in Jackson County, Missouri
Private high schools in Missouri
Private middle schools in Missouri
Private elementary schools in Missouri
1963 establishments in Missouri